The following is a list of drivers who are currently competing in the NTT Indycar series. Only full-time drivers are included in the list of drivers. Any person not on the list could be retired, a brand-new driver, or a part-time driver. All statistics are as of the end of the 2021 Firestone Grand Prix of St. Petersburg, April 25, 2021.

NTT IndyCar Series drivers
All statistics used in these tables are as of the end of the 2021 Firestone Grand Prix of St. Petersburg, April 25, 2021. The list is sorted by TEAM.

Full-time drivers

References
 https://www.indycar.com
 https://www.indycar.com/Drivers

External links
 https://www.indycar.com/Videos
 https://www.indycar.com/Photos
 https://www.indycar.com/News
 https://shop.ims.com/pages/indycar-homepage

2021 in IndyCar
IndyCar Series